ADGB may refer to:

Allgemeiner Deutscher Gewerkschaftsbund, confederation of German trade unions
Air Defence of Great Britain, the predecessor organization to RAF Fighter Command